Muhammad Shariff bin Abdul Samat (5 January 1984 – 10 February 2020) was a Singaporean international footballer.

Shariff is the son of former Singaporean international Samad Allapitchay and like his father, he usually played as a centre-back.

Club career
Shariff previously played for S.League clubs Sembawang Rangers FC, Young Lions and Tampines Rovers FC.

He was brought into the Tampines Rovers squad from the Young Lions after a stint with Sembawang Rangers FC, largely as a back-up player for the 2007/2008 highlighting season. However, due to teammate Sead Muratovic's failure to pass the annual fitness test, he became a major part of the first team's fixture in the S-League. He then joined Home United FC in 2010.

He was also known as a hot-tempered player, and was once handed out an eight-month ban by the Football Association of Singapore for throwing a punch at a Geylang United FC player, Peter Bennett in a S-League match when he was a Sembawang Rangers FC player.

Shariff spent half a season in the NFL Division 2 side Admiralty FC during the first half of 2012, and it was announced that he would rejoin S.League side Tampines Rovers for the second half of their 2012 season. However, he failed to break into the squad and was released at the end of the season.

On 2 February 2013, Shariff was unveiled as a Woodlands Wellington player during the team's pre-season fanfare.

He made his debut for the Rams on 5 March 2013 in an away game against his former club, Home United FC. Shariff put in an outstanding performance against the Protectors, his clearance off the line of Masato Fukui's shot being heralded as the turning point of the game by Woodlands coach, Salim Moin, during the post-match conference.

Shariff rejoined Tampines for the 2014 season, but was not retained for the 2015 season and played for another NFL side Singapore Recreation Club that year. He then was signed by Geylang International for the 2016 season, but was released at the end of the season.

International career
In 2008, under Radojko Avramović, Shariff was called up for the matches against North Korea, Saudi Arabia, Australia and the United Arab Emirates. However, he did not play in all of them.

In 2013, Shariff was called up by Bernd Stange because of his impressive performances for Woodlands Wellington in the S.League. He made his international debut on 4 June 2013, coming on as a substitute against Myanmar in a friendly match in Yangon.

Personal life and death
On 31 May 2001, Shariff, then 17 years old, encountered the 8-member gang 369, known as Salakau, who attacked him and his two other friends while they were walking along South Bridge Road, having mistook them as members of their rival gang Sakongsa (303). The gang killed one of his friends, then-17-year-old football player Sulaiman bin Hashim (with whom Shariff was close to). During the attack, Shariff, who was named Muhammad Shariff bin Abdul Samat in court documents at that time, was stabbed on the back but survived. Despite being stabbed, Shariff managed to escape to the nearest police station with his other friend (another footballer, Mohammed Imran bin Mohammed Ali) to inform the police. He was hospitalised and later discharged on 2 June 2001. Six of the attackers were eventually arrested, jailed and caned for rioting and culpable homicide, but the remaining two assailants remain at large till this day. The case was re-enacted in local crime show True Files, which features the death of Sulaiman and the murder trial of the Salakau gang members. Shariff, a survivor and witness of the attack, was portrayed by actor A.L. Imran. He was addressed solely by his given name in the episode to protect his real identity.

On 10 November 2015, Shariff assaulted his brother-in-law over an incident. He later pleaded guilty to voluntarily causing hurt to his brother-in-law and on 24 May 2016, he was sentenced to 2 weeks' imprisonment. The crime he was found guilty of would have led to him jailed up to two years and fined $5,000.

On 10 February 2020, Shariff died of a heart attack at the age of 36, leaving behind a wife and 4-year-old daughter.

Career statistics

Club

Shariff Abdul Samat's Profile

All numbers encased in brackets signify substitute appearances.

International appearances

Honours

Individual
S.League Young Player of the Year: 2007

References

External links

1984 births
2020 deaths
Singaporean footballers
Singapore international footballers
Tampines Rovers FC players
Home United FC players
Sembawang Rangers FC players
Place of death missing
Hougang United FC players
Woodlands Wellington FC players
Association football defenders
Singapore Premier League players
Young Lions FC players
Southeast Asian Games bronze medalists for Singapore
Southeast Asian Games medalists in football
Competitors at the 2007 Southeast Asian Games
People convicted of assault
Singaporean prisoners and detainees
Prisoners and detainees of Singapore